Carli Hermès (born 23 April 1963 in Schijndel) is a Dutch photographer and director.

Carli Hermès studied photography at the Royal Academy of Art (The Hague)  and The Arts Institute at Bournemouth in England. He became international known with his commercial photographs for brands like Martini, Swatch, Levi's, Mexx, Nike, WE, Philips, Sony, BMW, Suitsupply and Mercedes Benz. In addition, he also made several fashion reports for known magazines like; Dutch, ELLE, Zoom, Max, Black & White, Madame Figaro en Avenue. He also photographed internationally famous people such as Edgar Davids, Inge de Bruijn, Leon de Winter, Natalie Imbruglia and Rutger Hauer.

Besides his work as a photographer he is also active as a director for commercials and videos for brands like; G-star, Royal Club, Marco Borsato (Dutch singer) and the Dutch Railroad company.  In 2006 and 2007 Carli was a member of the jury of Holland's Next Top Model.

His latest work, "Elements", was presented from April until July 2008 in art gallery "Rademakers" in Amsterdam.

Publishings
Focus Cahier - Carli Hermès in Backstage (1990)
Carli Hermès - Both Sides (1995)
Smelik Stokking - Carli Hermès
Carli Hermès - Glitz (2003)
Carli Hermès - The Elements (2008)

References

External links
Official website Carli Hermès
Gallery Rademakers - Work and biography of Carli Hermès

1963 births
Living people
Dutch photographers
People from Schijndel
Royal Academy of Art, The Hague alumni
Alumni of Arts University Bournemouth